Stypandra is a small genus of rhizomatous perennials in the family Asphodelaceae, subfamily Hemerocallidoideae. They are native to Australia and New Caledonia.

Two species are currently recognized:

Stypandra glauca R.Br. (Nodding Blue Lily or Blind Grass) - Australia and New Caledonia
Stypandra jamesii Hopper  - Western Australia

See also Thelionema

References

 
 

 
Asphodelaceae genera
Hemerocallidoideae
Asparagales of Australia
Angiosperms of Western Australia
Flora of South Australia
Flora of Queensland
Flora of New South Wales
Flora of the Australian Capital Territory
Flora of Victoria (Australia)
Flora of New Caledonia